The Heideberg is a hill, up to , in the German state of Mecklenburg-Vorpommern in the district of Nordwestmecklenburg. It is one of the highest points in the district.

The wooded rise is located in the outer region of the municipality of Grevesmühlen only about six kilometres south of the Baltic Sea coast and the bay of Wohlenberger Wiek. It is just under 7 kilometres east of Grevesmühlen and rises immediately north of Barendorf. It is part of a ridge that runs from Grevesmühlen almost as far as Wismar.

The hill has a view of the Baltic. In the vicinity of the hill there are also important gravesites from the Stone and Bronze Ages.

Hills of Mecklenburg-Western Pomerania